Yongyuan may refer to:

Yongyuan Town (永源镇), town in Daowai District, Harbin, Heilongjiang, China

Historical eras
Yongyuan (永元, 89–105), era name used by Emperor He of Han
Yongyuan (永元, 499–501), era name used by Xiao Baojuan, emperor of Southern Qi